Political parties in Libya lists political parties in Libya.

Parties with seats in the General National Congress
National Forces Alliance
Justice and Construction Party
National Front Party
Wadi al-Hiya Alliance
Union for Homeland
National Centrist Party
Libyan National Democratic Party
The Message
The Foundation
National Party for Development and Welfare
Nation & Prosperity
Authenticity & Renewal
Authenticity & Progress
Moderate Umma Assembly
Libik Watani
National Gathering of Wadi al-Shati
Moderate Youth Party
Libyan List for Freedom & Development
National Coalition of Parties
Libya the Hope
Wisdom Party

Other parties
Taghyeer Party
Libu Party
Ensaf Movement
Democratic Party
Homeland Party
Party of Reform and Development
Libyan National Movement
Popular Front for the Liberation of Libya
Ihya Libya
Libyan Constitutional Union
Libyan Amazigh Congress
Alhaq and Democracy Party of Benghazi
Libyan National Congress Party
New Libya Party
National Unity of Libya Party
Freedom and Development Party of Libya
The Patriotic Reform Party
National Solidarity Party
The Libyan National Party
Umma Party
Justice and Democracy Party of Libya
Libya Future Party
Libyan Center Party
National Democratic Assembly for Justice and Progress
Libya Development Party
Libyan Universal Party
National Democratic Alliance
New National Congress Party
Tawasul Party
Libyan National Democratic Party for Justice and Development
Libya Our Home and Tribe Party
Libyan Liberation Party
Libya for All Party
Unity Movement
Democratic Youth Party
National Democratic Assembly
Wefaq Party
Libyan National Democratic Assemblage
Ansar Al Horria
Libyan Unionist Party

Banned parties
Libyan Popular National Movement

Defunct parties
Libyan Arab Socialist Ba'ath Party
Libyan Arab Socialist Union
Libyan Communist Party
Muslim Association of the Lictor
National Front for the Salvation of Libya
National Conference for the Libyan Opposition
Libyan National Democratic Front
Libyan Freedom and Democracy Campaign

See also
Lists of political parties

References

Libya
Political Parties
 
Libya
Political parties